Fantabulous Inc. is a 1968 Italian-French superhero crime film directed by Sergio Spina and starring Richard Harrison.

Cast
 Richard Harrison as Richard
 Judi West as Deborah
 Adolfo Celi as Von Beethoven
 Gustavo D'Arpe as Professor Krohne
 Fabienne Fabre as Alice
 Nino Fuscagni as Leonard MacFitzroy aka Zio Mac
 Silvio Bagolini
 Gislaine Barbot
 Enzo Fiermonte
 Aldo Bonamano
 Anita Cortinovis
 Manlio De Angelis as Russian General
 Arturo Dominici
 Giacomo Furia
 Virgilio Gazzolo

Production
Fantabulous Inc. was Sergio Spina's directorial debut. His next film was his second and last film L'asino 'doro.

Release
On the film's release, distributors changed the original Italian title Fantasbulous and replaced it with the title La donna, il sesso e il superuomo (lit. Woman, Sex and the Superman). The film was released in Italy in 1968.

Reception
In a contemporary review in Variety, Mosk. proclaimed that the creators of the film "may have imagined they were making a satirical, progressive pic. But it exploits sex, political notations, and comic strip origins without humor, insight or point to make this just a flaccid programmer that might be used in action or grind spots abroad on its unregenerate bad taste."

References

Footnotes

Sources

External links

1968 films
1968 crime films
1960s Italian-language films
Italian superhero films
French superhero films
1960s Italian films
1960s French films